Graham Reid may refer to:

 Graham Reid (field hockey) (born 1964), former Australian field hockey player
 Graham Reid (writer) (born 1945), writer from Northern Ireland
 Graham Reid (journalist), New Zealand journalist and music critic

See also
 Graeme Reid (born 1948), field hockey player from Australia
 Graham Reed (disambiguation)